Eta Orionis, Latinized from η Orionis, is a multiple star in the constellation Orion. It lies a little to the west of Orion's Belt between Delta Orionis and Rigel, being closer to Delta Orionis than to Rigel. It lies at a distance of around 1,000 light-years from Earth and is part of the Orion OB1 association.

System
Eta Orionis is listed in multiple star catalogues as having two companions: a bright component B less than 2″ away; and a faint component C nearly 2′ away. The two are estimated to orbit every 1,800 years.

The primary star, Eta Orionis A, is itself a spectroscopic triple star, known from multiple spectral lines with varying radial velocities. The most distant component Ac, has been resolved using speckle interferometry, at a separation of about 0.04″. It orbits the other two in 9.4 years. The two closest stars, Aa and Ab, are separated by only about a tenth of an astronomical unit and orbit in just under eight days.

The system lies within the Orion OB1 association, a group of massive stars that includes most of the bright stars of Orion. It is assigned to the oldest and closest part of the association, known as OB1a.

Variability

Eta Orionis drops in brightness every four days from a combined apparent magnitude of 3.31 to about magnitude 3.6. This is due to eclipses between the two closest components, Aa and Ab. The primary and secondary eclipses are very similar, 0.24 and 0.23 magnitudes deep, respectively.

It has also been suggested that component Ab is intrinsically variable with a period of 0.3 days and a very small amplitude. This star has unusual variable spectral lines and lies with the β Cephei variable instability strip. However, it is now thought that the variable component is either B and Ac, possibly due to an unseen companion or rotational modulation. The actual period is 0.432 days and the 0.3-day period was an alias.

See also 
 Orion's Sword

References

B-type main-sequence stars
Algol variables
Orion (constellation)
Orionis, Eta
BD-02 1235
Orionis, 28
035411
025281
1788